In March 924, the Qarmatians of Bahrayn attacked and looted a caravan of Hajj pilgrims making their way back from Mecca to Iraq. The raid, along with a failure to prevent a sack of Basra a few months before led to the deposition and execution of the Abbasid Caliphate's vizier, Ibn al-Furat.

Background
In the 890s, the Isma'ili missionary Abu Sa'id al-Jannabi established an independent Qarmatian state in Bahrayn. During Abu Sa'id's rule, the Qarmatians of Bahrayn remained uninvolved in the Isma'ili uprisings of the 900s against the Abbasid Caliphate in Syria and Iraq, or in the establishment of the Fatimid Caliphate in Ifriqiya. Apart from a raid against Basra in 912, they also maintained peace with the Abbasids, receiving donations of money and weapons by the Abbasid vizier, Ali ibn Isa ibn al-Jarrah. 

In January 923, Abu Sa'id's youngest son, Abu Tahir al-Jannabi, having reached the age of 16, succeeded to the leadership of the Qarmatians. At the same time, Ali ibn Isa lost his position, and was replaced by his more hawkish rival, Ibn al-Furat, who favoured military action. Abu Tahir, evidently ambitious to make his mark, likely took this as a pretext to attack the Abbasids. His first action was to attack the great port city of Basra, which his troops sacked and plundered for over two weeks in August 923. Rather than reacting to the Qarmatian threat, Ibn al-Furat remained concerned with securing his own position at court, exiling or torturing and killing many of his potential rivals.

Hajj raid
In March 924 the Hajj pilgrims set out on their return journeys from Mecca. The first caravan heading to Iraq was attacked and massacred by Abu Tahir and his men at al-Habir. News of this reached the subsequent caravans, which included several high officials and members of the Abbasid court, as they arrived at Faid, south of al-Habir. There they stopped, partly out of hesitation as to their course of action, and partly to allow the caravans following them to join up, so that together they might stand a better chance at confronting the Qarmatians. The commander of the escort, the Bedouin chieftain Abu'l-Hayja al-Hamdani, proposed to lead them via an alternative route to Wadi al-Qura, but the pilgrims refused his suggestion as it would entail too large a deviation. Once the supplies at Faid began to run out, the caravans set out toward al-Habir. As he was tasked with their protection, Abu'l-Hayja himself followed them. 

At al-Habir, Abu Tahir, with 800 cavalry and 1000 infantry, quickly overcame the pilgrims' resistance, killed many of them, and took many captives, including Abu'l-Hayja, the uncle of Caliph al-Muqtadir's mother, and other members of the court. The captives were transported to the Qarmatian capital at al-Ahsa, before they were released for large sums in ransom. The common pilgrims were largely left behind, but as the Qarmatians took their supplies and their camels, many perished of thirst and exhaustion while trying to reach settled areas. In addition, the Qarmatians took an enormous treasure in money, jewels, and precious items, including the caliph's ceremonial parasol.

Aftermath
The two events, which fell in the same Islamic year (311 AH), led chroniclers to label it the "year of destruction". Riots broke out in the streets of Baghdad against Ibn al-Furat, who now lost any support he might have had. Having alienated the civilian bureaucracy due to his torturing of former officials to extract money, and the military due to his failure to guarantee their salaries, the destruction of the Hajj caravan cost the vizier the backing of the common people as well. On 16 July the vizier was deposed and executed, along with his son al-Muhassin, in what amounted to a military coup. The event marked the final ascendance of the military over the civilian bureaucracy, with dire consequences for the future.

The Qarmatians continued attacking Hajj caravans over the following years, along with an invasion of Iraq in 927, which at one point threatened Baghdad itself and ranged as far as Upper Mesopotamia. In 930, the Qarmatians would even sack and pillage Mecca, but due to internal troubles, the Qarmatian threat subsided, and peaceful relations were established between Bahrayn and the Abbasid Caliphate.

References

Sources
 
 
 
 
 

920s conflicts
924
10th century in the Abbasid Caliphate
Battles involving the Abbasid Caliphate
Battles involving the Qarmatians
History of the Hajj
10th-century massacres